Iowa Highway 83 (Iowa 83) is a state highway that runs from east to west in western Iowa. The highway parallels Interstate 80 its entire length. Its western terminus is at U.S. Highway 59 in Avoca.  The eastern terminus is in Anita at an intersection with Iowa Highway 148.

Route description

Iowa Highway 83 begins in Avoca at US 59.  It heads eastward until Walnut, then briefly turns to the south before continuing east again.  It goes through Marne then goes southeasterly towards Atlantic.  It meets Iowa Highway 173 and then meets U.S. Highway 6 and U.S. Highway 71 in Atlantic.  They overlap briefly, then US 6 and US 71 turn north and IA 83 continues east on a previous alignment for US 6.  IA 83 passes through Wiota and ends in Anita at Iowa Highway 148.

History
At its initial designation, IA 83 was a spur between Avoca and Walnut.  On June 4, 1935, it was extended eastward to Atlantic, where it would end at US 6, replacing the old IA 271.  On August 12, 1959, it was again expanded to the west from Avoca to near Neola at an intersection with the old IA 191.  In 1973, the eastern segment was again extended from Atlantic to Anita.  Finally, on July 1, 2003, the highway was truncated west of US 59, forming its present-day alignment.  The old route west of US 59 is now Pottawattamie County Road G18.

Major intersections

References

External links

End of Iowa 83 at Iowa Highway Ends

083
83